The Amsterdam–Schiphol railway (also known as the Westtak Ringspoorbaan) is an important 17 kilometre long railway line in the Netherlands that connects Amsterdam with Amsterdam Airport Schiphol, and allows trains to continue to Leiden, The Hague, and Rotterdam.

History
The railway was opened by the Nederlandse Spoorwegen on 1 June 1986. The line prompted the opening of three new stations Amsterdam Sloterdijk, Amsterdam De Vlugtlaan and Amsterdam Lelylaan.

A fourth station, Amsterdam Aletta Jacobslaan, was planned but it was never opened; today, the Metro station Henk Sneevlietweg is situated on the proposed site.

In 1997 the Metro line 50 opened, running parallel with the line between Isolatorweg (between Amsterdam Centraal and Sloterdijk) and Henk Sneevlietweg (south of Amsterdam Lelylaan).

De Vlugtlaan station was closed in 2000 as part of the project to open the Hemboog which would link Schiphol with North Holland.

Route
The Amsterdam-Schiphol line leaves Amsterdam Centraal in a westerly direction. It passes Zaanstraat depot  from Amsterdam Centraal, where the Oude Lijn towards Haarlem diverges. The railway and metro both turn toward the south before reaching the bi-level Amsterdam Sloterdijk station. Here, the platforms on the line to Schiphol and the metro platforms are above the bottom lines for Haarlem and Zaandam. South of the station, the Hemboog with the line from Zaandam joins, passing through the former Amsterdam De Vlugtlaan station, which is now served only by the metro.  after Amsterdam Lelylaan station, the metro line branches off to the east towards Amsterdam Zuid, while the line towards Schiphol branches off to the west, where it joins the Weesp–Leiden railway (also known as the original Schiphollijn) coming from Amsterdam Zuid. For  the line runs in the median of the A4 motorway, before diving into the tunnel to Schiphol Airport railway station, located under the airport terminal. From Schiphol the line continues as the Schiphollijn to Leiden.

Services
The Amsterdam–Schiphol railway is used by the following passenger services:
 International services (Amsterdam – Brussels – Paris – London; Amsterdam – Brussels – Paris)
 Intercity Direct high speed services (Amsterdam – Rotterdam – Breda; Amsterdam – Rotterdam)
 Intercity services (Amsterdam – Dordrecht – Vlissingen; Lelystad – Den Haag Centraal; Groningen – Den Haag Centraal)
 Local services (Hoorn – Hoofddorp; Utrecht – Den Haag Centraal; Amersfoort Vathorst – Hoofddorp)

Types
A wide variety of trains can be found regularly on the Amsterdam–Schiphol railway:
 British Rail Class 374 on the Amsterdam – London Eurostar service
 Thalys PBA or Thalys PBKA on the Amsterdam – Paris Thalys service
 NS Class 186 on the Amsterdam – Breda and Amsterdam – Rotterdam Intercity Direct services
 NS DD-IRM on the Amsterdam – Vlissingen and Amsterdam – Den Haag Centraal services
 NS Sprinter on the Hoorn – Hoofddorp service between Amsterdam Sloterdijk and Schiphol Airport
 NID/DDZ on the Amsterdam – Vlissingen; Amsterdam – Den Haag Centraal; Hoorn – Hoofddorp services
 SLT on the Hoofdorp – Hoorn and Amersfoort Vathorst – Hoofddorp services

Railway lines in the Netherlands
Railway lines opened in 1986
1986 establishments in the Netherlands
Railway lines in North Holland
Railway lines in highway medians
Standard gauge railways in the Netherlands
Rail transport in Amsterdam
Regional rail in the Netherlands
20th-century architecture in the Netherlands